Goya is a Pakistani drama serial first aired on ARY Digital in 2015. It was written by Syed Mohammad Ahmed, produced by Humayun Saeed, Shehzad Nasib and directed by Farrukh Faiz. It features Sana Javed and Osman Khalid Butt as leads.

Plot summaray
Rahat Hashmi is a powerful, wealthy man whose word is law for his son, Omar and he wants that his son even stand and sit on his willingness but things take a turn when Omar meets a local reporter, Mohini and falls for her.

Cast

Sana Javed as Mohini 
Osman Khalid Butt as Omar
Farah Shah as Asma 
Furqan Qureshi as Ali
Usman Peerzada as Rahat Hasmi
Tara Mahmood as Omar's mother
Shamim Hilaly as Mrs. Imtiaz
Gohar Rasheed as Umer
 Hira Tareen as Zara
Asad Siddiqui

References

External links
 Official website

Pakistani drama television series
Urdu-language television shows
2015 Pakistani television series debuts